The Talparo Formation is a geologic formation in Trinidad and Tobago. It preserves fossils dating back to the Early Pliocene period.

See also 

 List of fossiliferous stratigraphic units in Trinidad and Tobago

References

Further reading 
 P. Jung. 1969. A Pliocene molluscan faunule from Trinidad. Bulletins of American Paleontology 7:85-89

Geologic formations of Trinidad and Tobago
Neogene Trinidad and Tobago